Cieślak is a Polish surname, it may refer to:
 Brad Cieslak (born 1982), American football tight end
 Bronisław Cieślak (1943–2021), Polish actor and politician
 Jadwiga Jankowska-Cieślak (born 1951), Polish actress
 Larissa Cieslak (born 1987), Brazilian swimmer
 Maciej Cieślak (born 1969), Polish guitarist and songwriter
 Marek Cieślak (born 1950), Polish speedway rider
 Michał Cieślak (born 1968), Polish rower
 Michał Cieślak (born 1974), Polish politician
 Michał Cieślak (born 1989), Polish boxer 
 Mikołaj Cieślak (born 1973), Polish actor and a cabaret artist
 Roman Cieślak, psychologist and professor at the SWPS University
 Ted Cieslak (1912–1993), Major League Baseball third baseman
 Włodzimierz Cieślak (born 1950), Polish wrestler
 Czesława Cieślak, birth name of Violetta Villas (1938–2011), Polish cabaret star, singer, actress, composer and songwriter

Polish-language surnames